Traversata is an album by American mandolinist David Grisman, Italian mandolinist Carlo Aonzo, and Italian guitarist Beppe Gambetta, playing guitar, mandolin, and the 14-string harp guitar.

The album comprises Italian-American instrumentals from the early part of the 20th century when Italians migrated in large numbers to the U.S. They called their trip overseas a traversata. In addition to traditional Italian folk music, the album includes versions of "Pickin' the Guitar" by Nick Lucas and "April Kisses" by Eddie Lang.

Track listing

 Costumi Siciliani (Sicilian Customs) (Giovanni Gioviale) 4:08
 Oh, Mio Babbino Caro (Oh, My Dear Daddy from Gianni Schicchi) (Giacomo Puccini) 2:20
 Idillio Primaverile (Idyll of Springtime) (Gioviale) 2:53
 Manzanillo (Valentine Abt) 2:23
 L'Onda (The Wave) (Pasquale Taraffo) 4:04
 Tarantella Op. 18 (Raffaele Calace) 3:04
 Intermezzo (from Cavalleria rusticana) (Pietro Mascagni) (3:04)
 Pickin' the Guitar (Pizzicando la Chitarra) (Nick Lucas) 3:43
 Violinata (Violin Serenade) (Attilio Margutti) 2:40
 Duo for Two Mandolins (Studio per Due Mandolini) (Rudy Cipolla) 3:30
 Valtzer Fantastico (Wonder Waltz) (Enrico Marucelli) 5:34
 The Godfather Waltz (Il Valzer del Padrino, from The Godfather) (Nino Rota) 2:55
 Mazurka VI Op. 141 (Calace) 2:55
 Serenata "a Ballo" (traditional) 3:14
 April Kisses (Baci d'Aprile) (Eddie Lang) 5:21

Personnel
 David Grisman – mandolin, mandola
 Carlo Aonzo – mandolin
 Beppe Gambetta – guitar, harp guitar
 Radim Zenkl – mandocello

References

External links
 Carlo Anonzo official website
 Beppe Gambetta official website
 David Grisman official website

2001 albums
David Grisman albums
Acoustic Disc albums